Action for the Climate Emergency, or ACE (formerly Alliance for Climate Education) is a 501(c)(3) nonprofit that provides educational resources on climate science and justice, as well training for young climate leaders. Since 2008, ACE has reached more than 2,000,000 students nationwide.

Programs

Education 
ACE provides in-person assemblies at high schools nationwide. A 2014 study by Stanford, Yale, and George Mason University showed that after viewing the live ACE Assembly, students demonstrated a 27% increase in climate science knowledge, more than one-third (38%) became more engaged on the issue of climate change, and the number of students who talked to parents or peers about climate change more than doubled.

ACE also offers an online multimedia resource for schools.

Leadership 
ACE youth leaders have lobbied elected officials for pro-climate policies including energy efficiency, fossil fuel divestment, and renewable energy. They have also spoken at events such as the United Nations, Bioneers, and Climate Action 2016.

Awards 
Awards for ACE's work include the White House Champion of Change Award for Climate Literacy, the National Center for Science Education Friend of the Planet Award, the AQMD Award for Public Education on Air Quality Issues, the EPA Environmental Merit Award, and the Climate Change Communicator of the Year Award.

See also 
 Climate change in the United States
 Education in the United States
 Environmental groups and resources serving K–12 schools

References 

Schools programs
Environmental organizations based in the United States
Environmental education in the United States